Lady Isabella Frederica Louisa de Pauw ( Hervey ; born 9 March 1982) is a British model and reality TV personality. She is the daughter of Victor Hervey, 6th Marquess of Bristol, the sister of Lady Victoria Hervey and the incumbent Frederick Hervey, 8th Marquess of Bristol, and half-sister of John Hervey, 7th Marquess of Bristol.

Early life
Lady Isabella was born in Monaco to Victor Hervey, 6th Marquess of Bristol and Lady Yvonne Hervey (née Sutton). Her godparents included Queen Fadila of Egypt and her half-brother John, Earl Jermyn. She was educated at Woldingham School. Her father died when she was three, and she was sent to boarding school at the age of six. She suffered from bulimia in her youth, but recovered after seeking treatment at The Priory hospital. She also joined Overeaters Anonymous. She enjoyed sports from an early age, including professional showjumping.

Career
Lady Isabella's television career has included appearing on the Channel 4 reality TV show The Games (2004), and for appearing as a contestant on ITV's Celebrity Love Island (2005).  In 2005, she was named "face of Playboy UK". She has appeared as a contestant on Celebrity MasterChef and the UK Sky One television programme Vroom Vroom. She also competed in the Sky One show Cirque De Celebrite, and the BBC1 show Hole in the Wall. She was awarded Sexiest Aristocrat in May 2006 and made the 62nd spot in FHMs 100 Sexiest Women in the World.

Her participation in The Games inspired her to try a new career as a personal trainer. She began running a set of fitness courses that included a jog around Hyde Park.

Family
Hervey has two elder full siblings, the incumbent Frederick Hervey, 8th Marquess of Bristol and fellow media personality Lady Victoria Hervey. In addition to John, who became the 7th Marquess, she had a half-brother Nicholas; both are now deceased.

In a 2005 interview, she stated that her title held her back in her modelling career. "When I first started, the bookers assumed I didn't need the cash, so wouldn't put me forward for the big money jobs. At the end of the day, just because I'm a Lady, it doesn't mean I'm rich." Her half-brother, the 7th Marquess, spent most of the £35 million family fortune in his lifetime, and she subsequently complained she had been left with "virtually nothing". Her father died before setting up a trust fund for her as he had for her two older siblings.

On 6 September 2014, Lady Isabella married Belgian millionaire Christophe de Pauw in the Église de Notre Dame de la Cambre, Brussels. The couple have a son, Victor, born on 5 January 2016 and named after her father, the 6th Marquess. He was the first member of the Hervey family to be christened at Ickworth Church in nearly 40 years. In 2010, her father was reburied in the church, as is traditional for Earls and Marquesses of Bristol, and she attended the ceremony with her family.

References

External links

Isabella Hervey Fitness

1982 births
Living people
Reality show winners
English Roman Catholics
English socialites
Daughters of British marquesses
Isabella
People educated at Woldingham School